A Josiphos ligand is a type of chiral diphosphine which has been modified to be substrate-specific; they are widely used for enantioselective synthesis. They are named after the technician who made the first one, Josi Puleo.

Applications
Homogeneous catalysis is often used for enantioselective transformations. The ligands carry chiral information and thus they are modified for individual substrates.  Ligands can also influence the chemoselectivity of the catalyst. The Josiphos ligands, often called privileged ligands, are important because of their ability to give high yields in enantioselective synthesis.

Josiphos ligands were developed in the 1990s by Antonio Togni in studies on ferrocenyl ligands previously discovered by T. Hayashi (1986). These studies focused of an Au(I)-catalyzed aldol reaction at The Central Research Laboratories of the former Ciba (now Novartis).  Diphosphine ligands were prepared with secondary phosphines, they are today known as Josiphos ligands family, which gets the name after Josi Puleo, the technician who prepared the first one. It was first tried in an Ru-catalyzed enamide hydrogenation synthesis resulting in ee’s higher than 99% and TOF of 1000h−1.  The ligand was applied to the synthesis of the herbicide (S)-metolachlor, the active ingredient in the most common herbicide in the United States.  The synthesis proceeds via the enantioselective hydrogenation of an imine (figure 2). The reaction proceeds with 100% conversion with TON over 7,000,000 and Turnover frequency (TOF) higher than 2,000,000 h−1. This process is the largest-scale application of enantioselective hydrogenation, producing over 10,000 tons/year of the desired product with 79% ee.

 
Figure 2: Xyliphos ligand

The ligands are also used in non-enantioselective reactions. They have been good ligands in Pd-catalyzed reaction of aryl chlorides and aryl vinyl tosylates with TON of 20,000 or higher. Also in the Pd/Josiphos  catalyzed carbonylation. Coupling with Grignards and Negishi coupling reactions

A variety of Josiphos ligands are commercially available, under licence from Solvias. The (R-S) and its enantiomer are commonly used  because they provide higher yields and higher enantioselectivities than the diastereomer (R,R). The ferrocene scaffold has proved to be versatile.  One structural parameter that influences reactivity is the bite angle. The P1-M-P2 angle has an average value of 92.7°.

Figure 3: View of general conformation of a Josiphos ligands complex

The general consensus for the naming is abbreviating the individual ligand as (R)-(S)-R2PF-PR’2. The substituent on the Cp is written in front of the F and the R on the chiral center after the F.

Synthesis of Josiphos ligands
The  preparation of Josiphos ligands starts from Ugi's amine.
 

Figure 4: Scheme for general synthesis of the Josiphos ligands
 
An important improvement since the first intent, and already pointed out in figure 4, has been using the N(CH3)2  group as the leaving group and not acetate. Also found was that the use of acetic acid as solvent gave better yields.

Reactions using Josiphos ligands

Some reactions that are accomplished using M-Josiphos complexes as catalyst are listed below. 
1) Hydroboration of styrene

Figure 5: Hydroboration of styrene

With ee’s up to 92% and TOF of 5-10h−1. The reaction is conducted at -78 °C.  Hayashi’s Rh-binap complex gives better yield.
 
2) Hydroformylation of Styrene

Figure 6: Hydroformylation of Styrene

 
Yields of up to 78 %ee of the (R) product, however low TON and TOF, 10-210 and 1-14h−1, respectively.

3) Reductive amination

Figure 7: Reductive amination

This is the preparation of (S)-metolachlor. It is highly dependent on the solvent where AcOH is necessary to achieve good yields and a 100% conversion.

4) Hydrogenation of exocyclic methyl imine

Figure 8:Hydrogenation of exocyclic methyl imine

This reaction is the key step to for the synthesis of a HIV integrase inhibitor, Crixivan. This reaction gave 97% ee with TON and TOF of 1000 and 480h−1, respectively. This is one of the few reactions known of a homogeneous heteroarene hydrogenation. Bulky R groups increase the catalyst’s performance.

5) Asymmetric synthesis of chromanoylpyridine derivatives
 

Figure 9: Asymmetric synthesis of chromanoylpyridine derivatives

This reaction shows an intermediate for the synthesis of a chromanoylpyridine derivative used for hair growth and as an antihypertensive agent. This reaction occurs with high enantioselectivity, but low activity.

Other reactions where Josiphos ligands can be used are; hydrogenation of C==C bonds, hydrogenation of C==N, C==C and C==O, catalyzed allylic substitution, hydrocarboxylation, Michael addition, allylic alkylation, Heck reaction, ring-opening of oxabicycles, isomerization of allylamines and allylic substitution.

References 

Coordination chemistry
Phosphines
Ferrocenes
Ligands
Diphosphines